Roberto Zaldivar is an Argentinian doctor of ophthalmology and refractive surgeon. He is credited with several breakthroughs in the use of lasers to correct visual impairments. His latest breakthrough is a new technique called bioptics, a term he introduced. He practices medicine at the Instituto Zaldivar, located in the Argentine city of Mendoza.

Prizes, awards and special mentions
Winner of the Research to Prevent Blindness Scholarship, New York 1983.
Storz - 1st Prize for Video, II Video Festival of SBIIO, "Three years of Experience with Anterior Chamber Implants for the Correction of the High Myopia" Brazil, 1992.
Recognition Award of the American Medical Association. Advanced Anterior Segment Meeting - The Barnet Dulaney Eye Foundation. Aspen 1996.
Lans Lecture Award, International Society of Refractive Surgery - first non-U.S. resident specialist to receive this prestigious award. 1998
Achievement Award, for many years of distinguished service in the programs of this society, American Academy of Ophthalmology, 1999.
Epstein Lecture Award, the first Hispanic ophthalmologist to be distinguished with this award, South African Society of Ophthalmology, 1999.
Certificate of Appreciation, Specialty Information Team-Refractive Management, American Academy of Ophthalmology, 2003-2004.
International Council Representative for Argentina, International Society of Refractive Surgery of the American Academy of Ophthalmology. 2003-2004.
1st Place Video Award in Scientific Contents: "Three year experience in Anterior Chamber Implants for High Myopia Correction. Where are we now? Annual Training Course of the Argentinean Society of Ophthalmology. 1992
The Honorable Chamber of Representatives distinguishes Dr. Roberto Zaldivar for his Lans Lecture Award for being the first non U.S. resident to receive the award. 1999. 
Man of the Year, mention on his scientific, entrepreneurial and humanitarian background. 1999.
FUNDECE Award, recognition for his entrepreneurial background, because of his excellence and permanent contribution. 2001.
The Honorable Chamber of Representatives recognizes Dr. Roberto Zaldivar for his humanitarian and constant work for his people as vice president for the Zaldivar Foundation. 2004
The Honorable Chamber of Senators for the Nation Recognizes Dr. Roberto Zaldivar with the Mention of Honor: Domingo Faustino Sarmiento as an important enterpriser for his country in improving the life of his fellow citizens, institutions and community.

Current affiliations
Former President of the Board of Congreso University, Mendoza, Argentina 
Scientific Director for Zaldivar Institute, Mendoza, Argentina 
Member of the Ocular Surgery News International Editorial Board
Scientific Consultant for Nidek International Co., Japan
Scientific Consultant for STAAR Surgical Company, U.S.
Former Scientific Consultant for C & C Vision, U.S.
Former Scientific Consultant for Bausch & Lomb, U.S. 
Founder and Former President of the Argentinean Society of Cataract and Refractive Surgery 
Member of the ISRS-AAO
Former Member of the American Board of Eye Surgeons
Member of the American Academy of Ophthalmology
Member of the American Society of Cataract and Refractive Surgery
Member of the International Club of Refractive Surgery
Member of the International Intra-Ocular Implant Club 
Member of the New York Academy of Science
Member of the Pan American Association of Ophthalmology
Former Member of the SIT Team, Academy´s Special Information Team
Member of the Refractive Society International Group-International Society of Refractive Surgery

References

"Bioptics popularity is on the rise" American Academy of Ophthalmology
Dartmouth Medical School Premio Lans

External links
 Instituto Zaldivar

People from Mendoza, Argentina
Living people
Year of birth missing (living people)